Lugash can refer to

 Lugash, a fictional country in The Pink Panther film series, including The Return of the Pink Panther
 Coach Lugash, a fictional character in The Simpsons television series